The 1937 Drake Bulldogs football team was an American football represented Drake University in the Missouri Valley Conference (MVC) during the 1937 college football season. In its fifth season under head coach Vee Green, the team compiled an 8–2 record (3–1 against MVC opponents), finished second in the MVC, and outscored all opponents by a total of 235 to 73.

Schedule

References

Drake
Drake Bulldogs football seasons
Drake Bulldogs football